Elvira Herzog (born 5 March 2000) is a Swiss footballer who plays as a goalkeeper for RB Leipzig and the Switzerland national team.

Career

Clubs 
Herzog started her career in autumn 2009 at FC Unterstrass, and joined FC Zürich Letzikids in 2011 at the age of 11, before moving up to the first team in 2016. She made her Zürich debut against Yverdon Féminin on 2 December 2017 and kept a clean sheet. On July 9, 2019, Herzog moved to Germany to join 1. FC Köln. After 1. FC Köln were relegated from the Bundesliga, she moved to SC Freiburg for the 2020/21 season. After the resurgence of 1. FC Köln in the Bundesliga, she moved to 2021/22 season back to their old club. She played in one league game. After the season she moved to the 2. Bundesliga with RB Leipzig.

International 
After eleven games for the U-17 and 16 games for the U-19 of Switzerland, she was called up to the senior national team for the first time on June 4, 2019. She made her debut for the Switzerland national team on 14 June 2019 against Serbia, coming on as a substitute for Nadja Furrer.

Honours 
 Swiss Championship: 2018, 2019
 Swiss Cup: 2018, 2019

References

2000 births
Living people
Women's association football goalkeepers
Swiss women's footballers
Switzerland women's international footballers
SC Freiburg (women) players
Footballers from Zürich
Frauen-Bundesliga players
Swiss expatriate women's footballers
Expatriate women's footballers in Germany
Swiss expatriate sportspeople in Germany
1. FC Köln (women) players
Association football goalkeepers
Expatriate footballers in Germany
Swiss expatriate footballers